The 2011–12 EHF Women's Cup Winners' Cup is the thirty-sixth edition of the EHF Women's Cup Winners' Cup, the continental event for domestic cup winners in Europe. FTC-Rail Cargo Hungaria entered the competition as title holders, following triumphed over CB Mar Alicante with an aggregate score of 57–52 in the previous year's finals. The Hungarian team went to the final in this season as well, where they successfully defended their title against Viborg HK with a 31–30 win both on the home and away leg, producing a 62–60 aggregate score.

Overview

Team allocation
According to the decision of the European Handball Federation made in April 2011, beginning from the 2011–12 season, the losers of the EHF Women's Champions League qualifiers will be relegated to the EHF Women's Cup Winners' Cup. The third and fourth placed teams of the first qualifying tournament together with the fourth placed clubs of the second qualifying tournament will enter the competition in the second round, while runners-up and third placed teams in the Qualifying Tournament 2 will join the cup in the third round.

The labels in the parentheses show how teams qualified for the EHF Cup Winners' Cup, if not directly via their domestic cup results:
 CL QT1: Losers from the EHF Champions League Qualifying Tournament 1
 CL QT2: Losers from the EHF Champions League Qualifying Tournament 2
 CL GS: Third placed teams from the EHF Champions League group stage
 TH: Title holders

Round and draw dates

Round 1
The draw for both of the first and the second round took place on 26 July 2011 in the European Handball Federation headquarters in Vienna, performed by ŽRK Krka Novo Mesto president Andrej Petkovič. Pursuant to the competition rules, the clubs were divided into two pots, with the highest ranked teams sorted in the seeded pot and the other ones situated in the unseeded pot. In the drawing procedure, seeded clubs were paired to unseeded teams one after another to form match-ups.

Seedings

Matches

|}

First leg

Second leg

Round 2

Seedings

Matches

|}

First leg

Second leg

Round 3
The draw of the third round matches took place on 11 October 2011 in the EHF headquarters Vienna with the contribution of Boško Ničić, mayor of Zaječar and president of RK Zaječar. The sixteen winners of the second round of the EHF Cup Winners' Cup were joined by the second and third placed teams of the EHF Champions League second qualifying tournaments to form a field of 24 teams. The eight clubs that were relegated from the Champions League together with the four highest ranked sides from the Cup Winners' Cup were selected into the first pot, while the remaining teams in the second pot. Teams were drawn into pairs with the first selected club having the right to organize the first leg on home ground.

Seedings

Matches

|}

Last 16

Seedings

Matches

|}

First leg

Second leg

Quarterfinals
The quarterfinals draw was carried out on 14 February 2012 in the EHF Headquarters in Vienna, Austria. Unlike in the earlier part of the competition, there was no seedings, but all the teams were pulled from the same pot. Teams drawn first from the pot were granted to play the first leg on home ground.

|}

Matches

First leg

Second leg

Semifinals

Matches

|}

First leg

Second leg

Final

Matches

|}

First leg

Second leg

Top scorers
The top scorers from the 2011–12 EHF Cup Winners' Cup are as follows:

References

External links
 

Women's EHF Cup Winners' Cup
2011 in women's handball
2012 in women's handball